This is a list of notable Nigerian Americans, including both original immigrants who obtained American citizenship and their American descendants. 
To be included in this list, the person must have a Wikipedia article showing they are Nigerian American and must have references showing they are Nigerian American and are notable.

Academia

Science and engineering

Kunle Olukotun, computer engineer and professor of electrical engineering and computer science at Stanford University and director of the Pervasive Parallelism Laboratory
Ilesanmi Adesida, physicist and material scientist
Victoria Chibuogu Nneji, computer scientist and roboticist
Jimmy Adegoke, climatologist
Omowunmi Sadik, chemist
Wendy Okolo, aerospace research engineer at NASA Ames Research Center
Akintunde Akinwande, professor of electrical engineering at the Massachusetts Institute of Technology
Samson Jenekhe, chemical engineer and professor of chemistry at University of Washington
Oluwatoyin Asojo, biochemist
Winston Wole Soboyejo, professor of mechanical engineering at Princeton University and Worcester Polytechnic Institute
Deji Akinwande, professor of electrical and computer engineering at the University of Texas at Austin, recipient of the Presidential Early Career Award for Scientists and Engineers
 John Dabiri, professor of aerospace engineering at the California Institute of Technology, recipient of MacArthur Fellowship
Alexander Animalu, theoretical physicist; member of the advisory board of the  Physica journal
Francisca Oboh Ikuenobe, geologist and professor of geology at the Missouri University of Science and Technology
Soni Oyekan, chemical engineer
Bolaji Aluko, professor of chemical engineering at Howard University
Lola Eniola-Adefeso, professor of chemical engineering at University of Michigan
Ndubuisi Ekekwe, electrical and computer engineer
Unoma Ndili Okorafor, computer scientist, wife of Ekpe Okorafor, and daughter of nuclear physicist Frank Nwachukwu Ndili
Philip Emeagwali, computer scientist and 1989 recipient of Gordon Bell Prize
Tam David-West, academic and virologist

Medicine

Latunde Odeku, first Nigerian neurosurgeon trained in the United States; pioneer of neurosurgery in Africa
Chidi Chike Achebe, physician executive and son of Chinua Achebe
Bankole Johnson, psychiatrist; discoverer of topiramate, a gamma-aminobutyric acid (GABA) facilitator and glutamate antagonist, as an effective treatment for alcoholism.
Olufunmilayo Olopade, hematology oncologist; director of the Cancer Risk Clinic at the University of Chicago Medical Center
Ikenna Ihim, doctor
Ola Akinboboye, nuclear cardiologist
Mojisola Adeyeye, pharmacist and professor of pharmaceutics at Duquesne University
Bennet Omalu, neuropathologist and professor at the University of California, Davis; first to discover and publish findings on chronic traumatic encephalopathy (CTE) in American football players
Nelson M. Oyesiku, vice chairman of neurological surgery and professor of endocrinology at the Emory University School of Medicine
Charles Rotimi, geneticist and director of the National Institutes of Health
Olawale Sulaiman, neurosurgeon; professor of neurosurgery at Tulane University
Segun Toyin Dawodu, physician and professor of pain medicine
Samuel Dagogo-Jack, discoverer of the first radioimmunoassay for epidermal growth factor in human saliva
Elizabeth Ofili, physician and cardiology researcher
Chidi Chike Achebe, physician executive
Jacqueline Nwando Olayiwola, Chair Professor of the Department of Family Medicine at The Ohio State University Wexner Medical Center
Clement Adebamowo, epidemiologist
Folakemi T. Odedina, professor of pharmacy and medicine at University of Florida
Andrew Agwunobi,  CEO of UConn Health
Oluyomi O.  Olusanya, Physician Executive

Humanities and social sciences

Kola Tubosun, linguist and founder of The YorubaName Project
Jacob Olupona, professor of African Studies and African American Studies at Harvard University
Abiola Irele, literary scholar and former professor at Harvard University
Claude Ake, political scientist, former professor at Columbia University and Yale University
Chinua Achebe, award-winning novelist, professor, literary scholar, and author of Things Fall Apart
Nwando Achebe, historian, feminist scholar, and daughter of Chinua Achebe
Farooq Kperogi, journalist and professor of journalism at Kennesaw State University
Nwando Achebe, historian and feminist scholar; professor of history at Michigan State University
Toyin Falola, historian and professor of African Studies
Bamidele A. Ojo, political scientist and professor of Political science and International studies
John Ogbu, anthropologist, "acting white" theorist
Ekpo Eyo, archaeologist and professor of African arts and Archeology at University of Maryland
Akinwumi Ogundiran, archaeologist, Chancellor's Professor and Professor of Africana Studies, Anthropology & History at UNC Charlotte.
 Obiwu (Obioma Paul Iwuanyanwu), writer and professor of English and creating writing at Central State University
 Wendy Osefo, public affairs academic, professor at the Johns Hopkins School of Education, and television personality
Emmanuel Chukwudi Eze, philosopher
Nkiru Nzegwu, philosopher and Distinguished Professor for Research at State University of New York at Binghamton
Kalu Ndukwe Kalu, political scientist and Distinguished Research Professor of Political Science and National Security Policy at Auburn University
Stephen Adebanji Akintoye, academic, historian and writer
Saheed Aderinto, professor of history at Western Carolina University
Elechukwu Njaka, political scientist; author of Igbo Political Culture
Olu Oguibe, professor of art at the University of Connecticut and senior fellow at the Smithsonian Institution in Washington, DC
Chika Okeke-Agulu, art historian
Joy Ogwu, political scientist
Leslye Obiora, professor of law at University of Arizona
Tejumola Olaniyan, Louise Durham Mead Professor of English and African Cultural Studies, and the Wole Soyinka Professor of the Humanities at the University of Wisconsin–Madison
Esiaba Irobi, Associate Professor of International Theatre and Film Studies at Ohio University, Athens, USA
Babatunde Lawal,  a Professor of Art History at Virginia Commonwealth University.

Mathematics
Nkechi Agwu, ethnomathematician and historian of mathematics
Abba Gumel,  computational mathematician and mathematical biologist, professor at Arizona State University
Chike Obi, pure mathematician
Kate Okikiolu, mathematical analyst
Yewande Olubummo,  mathematical analyst
Grace Alele-Williams, professor of mathematics education

Academic administration

Victor Ukpolo, chancellor of the Southern University at New Orleans
Benjamin Akande, president of Champlain College and Westminster College
Babatunde Ogunnaike, dean of the College of Engineering at the University of Delaware
Joseph Abiodun Balogun, dean of the College of Health Sciences at Chicago State University
 Ilesanmi Adesida, dean and professor emeritus of engineering at the Grainger College of Engineering (University of Illinois at Urbana-Champaign), provost at Nazarbayev University (in Kazakhstan)
 Johnson O. Akinleye, chancellor of North Carolina Central University
 ImeIme Umana, president of Harvard Law Review
 Nwando Achebe, Associate Dean for Diversity, Equity, and Inclusion in the College of Social Science at Michigan State University
 Okwui Enwezor, senior vice president of San Francisco Art Institute
 John Dabiri, Centennial Chair Professor at California Institute of Technology
 Andrew Agwunobi, president of University of Connecticut

Activism

Chief Temitope Ajayi, activist
Morénike Giwa-Onaiwu, autism and HIV advocate
Colion Noir (Collins Iyare Idehen Jr.), gun rights activist and spokesperson for the National Rifle Association
Opeoluwa Sotonwa, disability rights activist
Omoyele Sowore, human rights activist
Opal Tometi, social activist and co-founder of Black Lives Matter

Business

Temie Giwa-Tubosun, founder of LifeBank
Kunle Olukotun, founder of Afara Websystems
Pearlena Igbokwe, chairman of Universal Studios Group (division of NBCUniversal)
Jessica O. Matthews, venture capitalist and co-inventor of Soccket
John O. Agwunobi, pediatrician, former fourth-star admiral of the United States Public Health Service Commissioned Corps, former senior vice-president of Walmart, CEO of Herbalife
Lazarus Angbazo, president and CEO of General Electric in Nigeria
Tayo Oviosu, founder and CEO of Paga
Ndubuisi Ekekwe, founder and CEO of First Atlantic Semiconductors & Microelectronics
Soni Oyekan, CEO of Prafis Energy Solutions
Bisi Ezerioha, automotive engineer, racecar driver, industrialist, and CEO of Bisimoto Engineering
Adebayo Alonge, founder and CEO of RxAll Inc.
Nneka Egbujiobi, founder and CEO of Hello Africa
Michael Boulos, business executive and partner of Tiffany Trump
Adebayo Ogunlesi, investment banker, Chairman and Managing Partner at Global Infrastructure Partners
Maya Horgan Famodu, venture capitalist and founder of Ingressive
Ngozi Okonjo-Iweala, Director-General, World Trade Organization
Magnus L. Kpakol, Texas-based CEO and chairman of Economic and Business Strategies; former chief economic advisor to President Olusegun Obasanjo of Nigeria
Chris Aire, president of Solid 21 Incorporated
Angelica Nwandu, founder of The Shade Room
Tiyan Alile, celebrity chef and restaurateur

Government and politics

Wally Adeyemo, United States Deputy Secretary of the Treasury (2021-present)
Esther Agbaje, Democratic member of the Minnesota House of Representatives (2021-present)
John O. Agwunobi, former secretary of health for United States Department of Health and Human Services (2006-2007)
Yinka Faleti, Democratic candidate for Missouri Secretary of State in the 2020 election
Carol Kazeem, Pennsylvania State Representative
Richard Komi, former Democratic member of the New Hampshire House of Representatives (2018-2020)
Emmanuel Onunwor, former mayor of East Cleveland, Ohio (1998-2004)
Vop Osili, president of the Indianapolis City-County Council (2018-present)
Oye Owolewa, Democratic shadow representative for the District of Columbia in the United States House of Representatives (2021-present)

Journalism

 Sade Baderinwa, TV news anchor
 Lola Ogunnaike, entertainment journalist
 Adaora Udoji, Court TV host; CNNCNN correspondent
 Bukola Oriola, journalist
Ijeoma Oluo, author and commentator
Wendy Osefo, political commentator
Alexis Okeowo, staff writer at The New Yorker
Chika Oduah, correspondent for VICE News
Toluse Olorunnipa, White House Bureau Chief for The Washington Post
Chike Frankie Edozien, director of New York University, Accra
Karen Attiah, editor for The Washington Post

Sports

Basketball

 Ochai Agbaji
 Giannis Antetokounmpo
Suleiman Braimoh 
 Chamberlain Oguchi
 Arike Ogunbowale
 Chiney Ogwumike
 Nneka Ogwumike
 Semi Ojeleye
 Emeka Okafor
 Jahlil Okafor
 Isaac Okoro
 Stan Okoye
 Victor Oladipo
 Abi Olajuwon
 Hakeem Olajuwon
 Josh Akognon
 Al-Farouq Aminu
 Alade Aminu
 Aloysius Anagonye
 Isaac Okoro
 Udoka Azubuike
 Jordan Nwora
 Kelenna Azubuike
 Ekpe Udoh
 Ime Udoka
 Mfon Udoka
Bam Adebayo
Kenny Adeleke
 Ekene Ibekwe
 Gani Lawal 
 Andre Iguodala
 Ike Diogu
 Obinna Ekezie
 Shane Lawal
 Ebi Ere
 Festus Ezeli
 Ike Nwankwo
 Derrick Obasohan
 Nick Okorie

American Football
 Victor Abiamiri
 Emmanuel Acho
 Sam Acho
 Victor Aiyewa
 Jay Ajayi
 Josh Aladenoye
Obed Ariri
 Nnamdi Asomugha
 Jeremiah Attaochu
 Chidobe Awuzie
 Akin Ayodele
 Remi Ayodele
 Prince Amukamara
 Chris Banjo
 Samuel Eguavoen
 Isaiah Ekejiuba
 IK Enemkpali
 Tayo Fabuluje
 Samkon Gado
 Akbar Gbaja-Biamila
 James Ihedigbo
 Israel Idonije
 Buchie Ibeh
 Bobby Iwuchukwu
 Brian Iwuh
 Chidi Iwuoma
 Ade Jimoh
 N. D. Kalu
 Benson Mayowa
 Ovie Mughelli
 Chinedum Ndukwe
 Ike Ndukwe
 David Njoku
 Ty Nsekhe
 Uzoma Nwachukwu
 Uche Nwaneri
 David Ojabo
 Chukky Okobi
 Amobi Okoye
 Christian Okoye
 Chike Okeafor
 Alex Okafor
 Iheanyi Uwaezuoke
 Chris Ogbonnaya
 Cedric Ogbuehi
 Vince Oghobaase
 Eric Ogbogu
 Azeez Ojulari
 Brian Orakpo
 Kelechi Osemele
 Babatunde Oshinowo
 Kenechi Udeze
 Cyril Obiozor
 Tony Ugoh
 Valerian Ume-Ezeoke
 Cheta Ozougwu
 Adewale Ogunleye
 Russell Okung
Christian Sam

Soccer
 Abuchi Obinwa
 Oguchi Onyewu
 Bo Oshoniyi
 Ade Coker
 Maurice Edu 
Jean Harbor
 Folarin Balogun
 Amaechi Igwe
 Chioma Igwe
Ugo Ihemelu
 Chioma Ubogagu

Martial arts
 Sesugh Uhaa (Apollo Crews), professional wrestler
 Chike Lindsay, kickboxer
 Anthony Njokuani, kickboxer and mixed martial artist
 Muhammed Lawal, mixed martial artist
 Kamaru Usman, UFC fighter 
 Israel Adesanya, UFC fighter
Tolulope "Jordan" Omogbehin (Omos), professional wrestler and former college basketball player

Other
 Tanitoluwa Adewumi, chess player
 Foluke Akinradewo, volleyball player
 Jesse Iwuji, NASCAR driver
 Ogonna Nnamani, volleyball player
 Mary Akor, long-distance runner
 Ifeoma Mbanugo, long-distance runner
 Tuedon Morgan, long-distance runner

Music 

Abiodun Koya, classical opera
Tosin Abasi, lead guitarist of Animals as Leaders
Tunde Adebimpe, musician, actor
Tunji Balogun, record label executive
Chamillionaire, rapper
eLDee, musician, record label executive
Chika, rapper
Cozz, rapper
Davido, musician
Fat Tony, rapper
Ilacoin, musician, creator of the "Pause" game
Jidenna, rapper
Kami de Chukwu, rapper
Lil' O, rapper
Fela Sowande, musician and composer
Maxo Kream, rapper
Kevin Olusola, cellist and singer-songwriter
Toby Foyeh , Guitarist, Singer, Composer, Producer, a world touring Nigerian American musician with his band Orchestra Africa who has performed at many countries from USA, Canada, Japan, Malta, Jamaica, Grenada, Bahamas, Curacao etc
Tony Okungbowa, DJ
Kevin Olusola, musician, beatboxer
Sonny Digital, music producer
Tyler, The Creator, rapper
Michael Uzowuru, music producer
Wale, rapper
Wande, rapper, A&R
Patrice Wilson, music producer
Fred Onovwerosuoke, composer
Ahamefule J. Oluo, jazz trumpeter
Tobe Nwigwe, rapper
VanJess, R&B duo
Dot da Genius, music producer

Film

 Uzo Aduba, actress
 Sope Aluko, actress
 Gbenga Akinnagbe, actor
 Adewale Akinnuoye-Agbaje, actor
 Chet Anekwe, actor
 David Oyelowo, actor
 Megalyn Echikunwoke, actress
 Rick Famuyiwa, director
 Osas Ighodaro, actress
 Annie Ilonzeh, actress
 Nyambi Nyambi, actor
 Adepero Oduye, actress
 Dayo Okeniyi, actor
 Chiké Okonkwo, actor
 Folake Olowofoyeku, actress
 Okieriete Onaodowan, actor
 Yvonne Orji, actress
 Rotimi, actor
 Chet Anekwe, actor
 Chuku Modu, actor
 Sam Adegoke, actor
 Chinonye Chukwu, director
 Susan Nwokedi, filmmaker
 Ego Nwodim, actress, comedian
 Gina Yashere, actress, comedian
 Jovan Adepo, actor

Literature

 Chimamanda Ngozi Adichie, MacArthur Fellow
 Nnedi Okorafor, recipient of Nebula and Hugo Award
 Chris Abani, writer and poet
 Tomi Adeyemi, novelist
 Adaeze Atuegwu, writer
 Tochi Onyebuchi, novelist
Jordan Ifueko, novelist
 Teju Cole, writer and artist
 Akwaeke Emezi, writer
 Chinelo Okparanta, novelist
 Uzodinma Iweala, novelist
 Uche Nduka, poet
 Jeffrey Obomeghie, Writer
 Bayo Ojikutu, creative writer

Visual arts

 Ibiyinka Alao, architect
 Toyin Ojih Odutola, graphic artist
 Ade A. Olufeko, technologist and international curator
 Kehinde Wiley, portrait painter
 Marcia Kure, artist
 Izzy Odigie, choreographer
 Amarachi Nwosu, documentary filmmaker and photographer
 Mobolaji Dawodu, fashion designer
 Oshoke Abalu, architect and futurist
 Suzanna Ogunjami, artist
 Mendi & Keith Obadike, artists
Adejoke Tugbiyele, sculptor

Other 

 Olivia Anakwe, model
 Luvvie Ajayi, comedian and blogger
 Kimberly Anyadike, pilot
 Uzo Asonye, partner at Davis Polk & Wardwell
 Yinka Faleti, United States Army officer
 Godfrey (comedian), comedian
 Mayowa Nicholas, model

References 

Nigerian Americans
Nigerian Americans

Americans
Nigerian